The Bayer designation κ Coronae Australis (Kappa Coronae Australis) is shared by two stars in the constellation Corona Australis:

Kappa1 Coronae Australis, HR 6952
Kappa2 Coronae Australis, HR 6953

It was found to be a double star by English astronomer John Herschel in 1836. The pair have an angular separation of  along a position angle of 359°.

References

Corona Australis
Coronae Australis, Kappa